Agate is a common rock formation, consisting of chalcedony and quartz as its primary components, with a wide variety of colors. Agates are primarily formed within volcanic and metamorphic rocks. The ornamental use of agate was common in Ancient Greece, in assorted jewelry and in the seal stones of Greek warriors,  while bead necklaces with pierced and polished agate date back to the 3rd millennium BCE in the Indus Valley civilisation.

Etymology 
The stone was given its name by Theophrastus, a Greek philosopher and naturalist, who discovered the stone along the shore line of the Dirillo River or Achates in Sicily, sometime between the 4th and 3rd centuries BCE.

Formation and properties

Agate minerals have the tendency to form on or within pre-existing rocks, creating difficulties in accurately determining their time of formation. Their host rocks have been dated to have formed as early as the Archean Eon. Agates are most commonly found as nodules within the cavities of volcanic rocks. These cavities are formed from the gases trapped within the liquid volcanic material forming vesicles. Cavities are then filled in with silica-rich fluids from the volcanic material, layers are deposited on the walls of the cavity slowly working their way inwards. The first layer deposited on the cavity walls is commonly known as the priming layer. Variations in the character of the solution or in the conditions of deposition may cause a corresponding variation in the successive layers. These variations in layers result in bands of chalcedony, often alternating with layers of crystalline quartz forming banded agate. Hollow agates can also form due to the deposition of liquid-rich silica not penetrating deep enough to fill the cavity completely. Agate will form crystals within the reduced cavity, and the apex of each crystal may point towards the center of the cavity.

The priming layer is often dark green, but can be modified by iron oxide resulting in a rust like appearance. Agate is very durable, and is often found detached from its host matrix, which has eroded away. Once removed, the outer surface is usually pitted and rough from filling the cavity of its former matrix. Agates have also been found in sedimentary rocks, normally in limestone or dolomite; these sedimentary rocks acquire cavities often from decomposed branches or other buried organic material. If silica-rich fluids are able to penetrate into these cavities agates can be formed.

Types
Lace agate is a variety that exhibits a lace-like pattern with forms such as eyes, swirls, bands or zigzags. Blue lace agate is found in Africa and is especially hard. Crazy lace agate, typically found in Mexico, is often brightly colored with a complex pattern, demonstrating randomized distribution of contour lines and circular droplets, scattered throughout the rock. The stone is typically coloured red and white but is also seen to exhibit yellow and grey combinations as well.

Moss agate, as the name suggests, exhibits a moss-like pattern and is of a greenish colour. The coloration is not created by any vegetative growth, but rather through the mixture of chalcedony and oxidized iron hornblende. Dendritic agate also displays vegetative features, including fern-like patterns formed due to the presence of manganese and iron oxides.

Turritella agate (Elimia tenera) is formed from the shells of fossilized freshwater Turritella gastropods with elongated spiral shells. Similarly, coral, petrified wood, porous rocks and other organic remains can also form agate.

Coldwater agates, such as the Lake Michigan cloud agate, did not form under volcanic processes, but instead formed within the limestone and dolomite strata of marine origin. Like volcanic-origin agates, Coldwater agates formed from silica gels that lined pockets and seams within the bedrock. These agates are typically less colorful, with banded lines of grey and white chalcedony.

Greek agate is a name given to pale white to tan colored agate found in the former Greek colony of Sicily as early as 400 BCE. The Greeks used it for making jewelry and beads.

Brazilian agate is found as sizable geodes of layered nodules. These occur in brownish tones inter-layered with white and gray. It is often dyed in various colors for ornamental purposes.

Polyhedroid agate forms in a flat-sided shape similar to a polyhedron. When sliced, it often shows a characteristic layering of concentric polygons. It has been suggested that growth is not crystallographically controlled but is due to the filling-in of spaces between pre-existing crystals which have since dissolved.

Iris agate is a finely-banded and usually colorless agate, that when thinly sliced, exhibits spectral decomposition of white light into its constituent colors, requiring 400 to up to 30,000 bands per inch.

Other forms of agate include Holley blue agate (also spelled "Holly blue agate"), a rare dark blue ribbon agate found only near Holley, Oregon; Lake Superior agate; Carnelian agate (has reddish hues); Botswana agate; plume agate; condor agate; tube agate containing visible flow channels or pinhole-sized "tubes"; fortification agate with contrasting concentric banding reminiscent of defensive ditches and walls around ancient forts; Binghamite, a variety found only on the Cuyuna iron range (near Crosby) in Crow Wing County, Minnesota; fire agate showing an iridescent, internal flash or "fire," the result of a layer of clear agate over a layer of hydrothermally deposited hematite; Patuxent River stone, a red and yellow form of agate only found in Maryland; and enhydro agate, which contains tiny inclusions of water, sometimes with air bubbles.

Agate is a versatile gemstone that is often used in jewelry making.  Agate is favored for its durability, with a Mohs scale hardness rating of 6.5-7.  It is known for its colorful, banded patterns and wide range of hues.   Agate is found in a wide range of colors, including shades of red, orange, yellow, green, blue, purple, and pink, as well as black and white.   Agate is generally more affordable than other gemstones.

Uses 

Agate is one of the most common materials used in the art of hardstone carving, and has been recovered at a number of ancient sites, indicating its widespread use in the ancient world; for example, archaeological recovery at the Knossos site on Crete illustrates its role in Bronze Age Minoan culture.  It has also been used for centuries for leather burnishing tools.

The decorative arts use it to make ornaments such as pins, brooches or other types of jewellery, paper knives, inkstands, marbles and seals. Agate is also still used today for decorative displays, cabochons, beads, carvings and Intarsia art as well as face-polished and tumble-polished specimens of varying size and origin. Idar-Oberstein was one of the centers which made use of agate on an industrial scale. Where in the beginning locally found agates were used to make all types of objects for the European market, this became a globalized business around the turn of the 20th century: Idar-Oberstein imported large quantities of agate from Brazil, as ship's ballast. Making use of a variety of proprietary chemical processes, they produced colored beads that were sold around the globe. Agates have long been used in arts and crafts. The sanctuary of a Presbyterian church in Yachats, Oregon, has six windows with panes made of agates collected from the local beaches.

Industrial uses of agate exploit its hardness, ability to retain a highly polished surface finish and resistance to chemical attack. It has traditionally been used to make knife-edge bearings for laboratory balances and precision pendulums, and sometimes to make mortars and pestles to crush and mix chemicals.

Health impact
Respiratory diseases such as silicosis, and a higher incidence of tuberculosis among workers involved in the agate industry, have been studied in India and China.

See also

 Amber
 Amethyst
 Aqeeq
 Aquamarine
 Citrine
 Diamond
 Emerald
 Garnet
 Geode
 Kyanite
 Labradorite
 
 Lithophysa
 Moonstone
 Opal
 Peridot
 Rose Quartz
 Swiss Blue Topaz
 Thunderegg
 Tiger's Eye
 Topaz
 Tourmaline

Citations

General and cited references 
 Cross, Brad L. and Zeitner, June Culp. Geodes: Nature's Treasures. Bardwin Park, Calif.: Gem Guides Book Co. 2005.
 Hart, Gilbert "The Nomenclature of Silica", American Mineralogist, Volume 12, pages 383–395, 1927
 International Colored Gemstone Association, "Agate: banded beauty"
 "Agate", Mindat.org, Hudson Institute of Mineralogy
 Moxon, Terry. Agate: Microstructure and Possible Origin. Doncaster, S. Yorks, UK: Terra Publications, 1996.
 Pabian, Roger, et al. Agates: Treasures of the Earth. Buffalo, New York: Firefly Books, 2006.
 Schumann, Walter. Gemstones of the World. 3rd edition. New York: Sterling, 2006.

External links

 "Agates", School of Natural Resources, University of Nebraska-Lincoln (retrieved 27 December 2014).

 
Hardstone carving
Silicate minerals
Symbols of South Dakota